Iridium tetroxide (IrO4, Iridium(VIII) oxide) is a binary compound of oxygen and iridium in oxidation state +8. At higher temperatures, the oxide is unstable. The detection of the iridium tetroxide cation  by infrared photodissociation spectroscopy with formal oxidation state +9 has been reported, the highest currently known of any element. However no salts are known, as attempted production of an Ir(IX) salt such as IrO4SbF6 did not result in anything.

References

External links

Tetroxide
Substances discovered in the 2000s
Transition metal oxides
Oxycations